Lütfi Ömer Akad (2 September 1916 – 19 November 2011) was a Turkish film director, screenwriter, academician.
Who directed movies from 1948 to 1990. In 1949, he debuted as a film director with Vurun Kahpeye ("Strike the Whore") an adaptation of Halide Edib Adıvar's book of the same title. He became one of the pioneers of the period in the "Director Generation". His 1970s trilogy comprising The Bride, The Wedding and The Sacrifice, is considered his masterpiece. Afterwards, he withdrew from movie making instead directing adaptations for TV.

Ömer Lütfi Akad was born on September 2, 1916. Following his secondary education at French Jeanne d’Arc School and Galatasaray High School, he studied finance at Istanbul Economy and Commerce Higher School. Beside his occupation as financial advisor at Sema Film company, he wrote articles on theatre and cinema. After directing more than 100 movies, Ömer Lütfi Akad taught twenty years at the Mimar Sinan Fine Arts University.

He died on 19 November 2011 at the age of 95 in Istanbul.

Filmography 

 Vurun Kahpeye 1948
 Lüküs Hayat 1950
 Tahir ile Zühre 1951
 Arzu ile Kamber 1951
 Kanun Namına 1952
 İngiliz Kemal 1952
 Altı Ölü Var 1953
 Katil 1953
 Çalsın Sazlar Oynasın Kızlar 1953
 Bulgar Sadık 1954
 Vahşi Bir Kız Sevdim 1954
 Kardeş Kurşunu 1954
 Görünmeyen Adam İstanbul'da 1954
 Meçhul Kadın 1955
 Kalbimin Şarkısı 1955
 Ak altın 1956
 Kara Talih 1957
 Meyhanecinin Kızı 1957
 Zümrüt 1958
 Ana Kucağı 1958
 Yalnızlar Rıhtımı 1959
 Cilalı ibo'nun Çilesi 1959
 Yangın Var 1959
 Dişi Kurt 1960
 Sessiz Harp 1961
 Üç Tekerlekli Bisiklet 1962
 Tanrı'nın Bağışı Orman 1964
 Sırat Köprüsü 1966
 Hudutların Kanunu 1966
 Kızılırmak Karakoyun 1967
 Ana 1967
 Kurbanlık Katil 1967
 Vesikalı Yarim  1968
 Kader Böyle İstedi 1968
 Seninle Ölmek İstiyorum 1969 (color)
 Bir Teselli Ver 1971
 Mahşere Kadar 1971
 Vahşi Çiçek 1971
 Yaralı Kurt 1972
 Gökçe Çiçek 1973
 Gelin 1973
 Düğün 1974
 Diyet 1975
 Esir Hayat 1974

References

External links 
 

1916 births
Turkish film directors
Turkish male screenwriters
Turkish film producers
Best Director Golden Orange Award winners
Golden Orange Honorary Award winners
2011 deaths
Galatasaray High School alumni
Academic staff of Mimar Sinan Fine Arts University
Burials at Ulus Cemetery